Indus is a constellation in the southern sky first professionally surveyed by Europeans in the 1590s and mapped on a globe by Petrus Plancius by early 1598. It was included on a plate illustrating southern constellations in Bayer's sky atlas Uranometria in 1603.  It lies well south of the Tropic of Capricorn but its triangular shape can be seen for most of the year from the Equator. It is elongated from north to south and has a complex boundary.  The English translation of its name is generally given as the Indian, though it is unclear which indigenous people the constellation was originally supposed to represent.

Features

Indus lacks stars of the top 100 in brightness viewed from the solar system (apparent magnitude).  Two of its stars rank of third magnitude and three of fourth magnitude.

Alpha Indi, its brightest, is an orange giant of magnitude 3.1, 101 light-years away. Beta Indi is an orange giant of magnitude 3.7, 600 light-years distant. Delta Indi is a white star of magnitude 4.4, 185 light-years from Earth.  The three form a near-perfect right-angled triangle, such that Beta marks the right angle and is in the south-east.

Epsilon Indi is one of the closest stars to Earth, approximately 11.8 light years away. It is an orange dwarf of magnitude 4.7, meaning that the yellow dwarf Sun is slightly hotter and larger. The system has been discovered to contain a pair of binary brown dwarfs, and has long been a prime candidate in SETI studies. This star has the third-highest proper motion of all visible to the unaided eye, as ranks behind Groombridge 1830 and 61 Cygni, and the ninth-highest overall. This will move the star into Tucana around 2640.  It figures directly between Alpha and Beta.

Indus is home to one bright binary star. Theta Indi is a binary star divisible in small amateur telescopes, 97 light-years from Earth. Its primary is a white star of magnitude 4.5 and its secondary is a white star of magnitude 7.0. It figures close to the hypotenuse of the right-angled triangle of Alpha, Beta and Delta, the three brightest stars of Indus.

T Indi is the only bright variable star in Indus. It is a semi-regular, deeply coloured red giant with a period of 11 months, 1900 light-years away. Its minimum magnitude is 7 and its maximum: 5.

Galaxies include NGC 7090 and NGC 7049.

All Sky Automated Survey for SuperNovae (ASAS-SN) in 2015 detected a superluminous supernova, named ASASSN-15lh (also designated SN 2015L). Based on the study conducted by Subo Dong and team from the Kavli Institute for Astronomy and Astrophysics (KIAA) at Peking University, it was approximately doubly luminous to any supernova detected, and at peak was almost 50 times more intrinsically luminous than the Milky Way.
Its distance: approximately 3.82 gigalight-years, denoting an age approximately half that of the universe.

History

The constellation was created by Petrus Plancius who made a fairly large celestial globe from the observations of Pieter Dirkszoon Keyser and Frederick de Houtman. The first depiction of this constellation in a celestial atlas followed in Johann Bayer's Uranometria of 1603. Plancius portrayed the figure as a nude male with three arrows in one hand and one in the other, as a native, lacking quiver and bow. It is among the twelve constellations introduced by Keyser and de Houtman, which first appeared on a celestial globe in 1598.

See also
 IAU-recognized constellations
 Indus (Chinese astronomy)

References

Sources
 
 
 Ian Ridpath and Wil Tirion (2007). Stars and Planets Guide, Collins, London. . Princeton University Press, Princeton. .

External links
 The Deep Photographic Guide to the Constellations: Indus
 The clickable Indus
 Starry Night Photography: Indus Constellation
 Star Tales–Indus
 

 
Southern constellations
Constellations listed by Petrus Plancius
Astronomy in the Dutch Republic
Dutch celestial cartography in the Age of Discovery
1590s in the Dutch Republic